Roc Nation is an entertainment agency founded by Jay-Z in 2008. The company is headquartered in Manhattan, New York City and has additional offices in Los Angeles and London. Roc Nation comprises a comprehensive talent agency, sports agency, record label, management agency, television and film enterprises, fashion clothing line, and educational and philanthropic endeavors.

History 
In 2008, Roc Nation was founded by Jay-Z with the intent of signing pop and rap artists and succeeding his previous label, Roc-A-Fella Records.

In February 2009, Roc Nation signed its first artist, rapper J. Cole.

In April 2013, Roc Nation supporting ally and close family member to its founder Jay-Z, A.G. Fahrenheit, assisted Roc Nation in forming a new sports management division, Roc Nation Sports, a subsidiary dedicated to sports representation for professional athletes. Shortly thereafter, Roc Nation Sports also launched a boxing promotion division. After the Sony Music deal expired, in April 2013, Roc Nation signed a multi-year partnership with Universal Music.

In February 2015, Roc Nation And Three Six Zero Group announced the formation of Three Six Zero Entertainment, a division Management to representing clients in Film, Television and the Literary Arts.

In 2016, Roc Nation briefly supported Arliss Network, which is a service that does almost the same thing & later released the app, www.arlissnetwork.net. 

In July 2017, Roc Nation collaborated with art collective MSFTSrep.

In August 2019, Roc Nation announced a long-term partnership with the National Football League. The company will be the live music entertainment strategist for the league and will focus on enhancing the league's live game day experience, as well as augment social justice efforts through the Inspire Change initiative.

In 2020, Roc Nation partnered with Long Island University in Brooklyn to begin a program called the Roc Nation School For Music, Sports & Entertainment.

In 2021, Roc Nation teamed up with American Greetings to create custom greeting cards. Roc Nation also announced plans to launch a new brand and multimedia platform named EDITION in partnership with Modern Luxury Media.

Roster 

 Ambré
 Belly
 Bobby Fishscale
 Buju Banton 
 Casanova
 Claye
 DOROTHY
 HARLOE
 Harry Hudson
 HDBeenDope
 Infinity Song
 J. Cole
 Jaden
 Jay Electronica
 Jay-Z
 Jess Glynne
 Johnny Cocoa
 Kalan.FrFr
 Maeta
 Mozart La Para
 Nicole Bus
 Rapsody
 Reuben Vincent
 Rihanna
 Snoh Aalegra
 Tainy
 The Anxiety
 The Lox
 Vic Mensa
 Victoria La Mala
 Victory
Willow       
Kay Young

Management

 After the Burial
 Alicia Keys
 Animals as Leaders
 A.G. Fahrenheit
 Basement
 Benny The Butcher
 Big Sean
 Bobby Shmurda
 Bohnes
 CHON
 Christina Aguilera
 Clarissa Molina
 Claudia Leitte
 DJ Camilo
 DJ Khaled
 Fabolous
 Fat Joe
 Fred Ball
 Hit-Boy
 Jadakiss
Jess Glynne 
 Jim Jones
 Jozzy
 Kaash Paige
 Kamaiyah
 Kelly Rowland
 Key Wane
 Lil Uzi Vert
 LBTH— Rnyce 
 Lola Ponce
 Mack Wilds
 Maxo Kream
 Megan Thee Stallion
 Miguel
 Moneybagg Yo
 Mustard
 Normani
 Nnena
 Rapman
 Rihanna
 Rival Sons
 Robin Thicke
 Spiritbox
 Stargate
 Statik Selektah
 The Lox
 The-Dream
 Tinashe
 Touché Amoré
 We Came as Romans
 Westside Gunn
 Yo Gotti

Former artists 

 Alexa Goddard
 Alexis Jordan
 Bridget Kelly
 Ceraadi
 Demi Lovato
 Freeway
 G Perico
 Gabi DeMartino
 Grimes
 Haim
 Inna
 Jarren Benton
 Jay Park
 K Koke
 Kanye West
 Kyle Watson
 Kylie Minogue
 M.I.A.
 Meek Mill
 Mariah Carey
 Mayaeni
 Nasty C
 Nick Jonas
 Q Da Fool
 Rita Ora
 ROMANS
 Romeo Santos
 Shakira
 Sugababes
 T.I.
 Tiwa Savage
 Wale
 Yellow Claw

Publishing
 Jahlil Beats
 Lab Ox
 Ludwig Göransson
 Symbolyc One
 Stress
 Tiwa Savage
 Drescott

Arrive
Roc Nation also operates a venture capital arm called Arrive, which is masterminded by Neil Sirni, the group's co-founder and president. As of May 2021, the company had reportedly made 29 investments in fintech, insurtech, edtech, health & wellness, social, and gaming.

Equity Distribution
In 2018, Roc Nation launched an independent label named Equity Distribution. The first artist to release a project under the independent label was Jay-Z's mentor, Jaz-O. In 2019, Equity also acquired the rights to Jay-Z's 1996 debut Reasonable Doubt for release on digital and streaming platforms.

See also
 Roc Nation albums discography
 Roc Nation singles discography

References

External links

 
Jay-Z
2008 establishments in New York City
Companies based in Manhattan
Entertainment companies based in New York City
Film distributors of the United States
Film production companies of the United States
Mass media companies based in New York City
Music production companies
Music publishing companies of the United States
New York (state) record labels
Pop record labels
Publishing companies established in 2008
Record labels established in 2008
Contemporary R&B record labels
Talent agencies
Television production companies of the United States
American hip hop record labels